Simone Bolelli and Máximo González were the defending champions but Bolelli chose not to participate. González was scheduled to partner Nicolás Jarry, but Jarry withdrew with a right elbow injury before their first round match.

Rafael Matos and Felipe Meligeni Alves won the title, defeating André Göransson and Nathaniel Lammons in the final, 7–6(10–8), 7–6(7–3).

Seeds

Draw

Draw

References

External links
 Main draw

Chile Open - Doubles
2022 Doubles